In geometry, a trochoid is a roulette curve formed by a circle rolling along a line. It is the curve traced out by a point fixed to a circle (where the point may be on, inside, or outside the circle) as it rolls along a straight line. If the point is on the circle, the trochoid is called common (also known as a cycloid); if the point is inside the circle, the trochoid is curtate; and if the point is outside the circle, the trochoid is prolate. The word "trochoid" was coined by Gilles de Roberval.

Basic description

Let .

where  is the variable angle through which the circle rolls.

Curtate, common, prolate
If  lies inside the circle, on its circumference, or outside, the trochoid is described as being curtate ("contracted"), common, or prolate ("extended"), respectively. A curtate trochoid is traced by a pedal (relative to the ground) when a normally geared bicycle is pedaled along a straight line. A prolate trochoid is traced by the tip of a paddle (relative to the water's surface) when a boat is driven with constant velocity by paddle wheels; this curve contains loops. A common trochoid, also called a cycloid, has cusps at the points where  touches the line .

General description

which axis is being translated in the x-y-plane at a constant rate in either a straight line,

The ratio of the rates of motion and whether the moving axis translates in a straight or circular path determines the shape of the trochoid. In the case of a straight path, one full rotation coincides with one period of a periodic (repeating) locus. In the case of a circular path for the moving axis, the locus is periodic only if the ratio of these angular motions, is a rational number, say , where  &  are coprime, in which case, one period consists of  orbits around the moving axis and  orbits of the moving axis around the point . The special cases of the epicycloid and hypocycloid, generated by tracing the locus of a point on the perimeter of a circle of radius  while it is rolled on the perimeter of a stationary circle of radius , have the following properties:

where  is the radius of the orbit of the moving axis. The number of cusps given above also hold true for any epitrochoid and hypotrochoid, with "cusps" replaced by either "radial maxima" or "radial minima".

See also 
 Aristotle's wheel paradox
 Brachistochrone
 Cyclogon
 Cycloid
 Epitrochoid
 Hypotrochoid
 List of periodic functions
 Roulette (curve)
 Spirograph
 Trochoidal wave

References

External links
 Online experiments with the Trochoid using JSXGraph

Roulettes (curve)